Charles Edgar Brumfield (born June 9, 1948) is an American attorney and former professional racquetball player as well as a noted paddleball player. For much of his professional racquetball career, Brumfield was the marquis player for Leach Industries, the leading manufacturer of racquetball rackets at the time. Leach produced several Brumfield signature rackets including the very popular "Graphite Brumfield". For a brief time, Brumfield had his own sports brand label, which marketed rackets and sports apparel.

Brumfield was the #1 player on the men's professional racquetball tour for most of the 1970s, winning 4 championships and dominating most of the tournaments he participated in. This was a golden age for racquetball, when the sport was one of the fastest growing leisure activities in North America. The names of the top players were well known outside the sport, and the best players could earn large sums of money in endorsements. Steve Keeley ranks Brumfield as the 4th greatest racquetball player of all time, after Cliff Swain, Marty Hogan, and Sudsy Monchik. Brumfield retired from professional racquetball in the early 1980s, settling into a successful career as an attorney in San Diego. He has a son, Conor, who also resides in San Diego. Both are avid golfers.

Professional sports career 
Brumfield began as a handball player until a dislocated finger prompted him to take up paddleball in 1964. His play came to the attention of Bud Muehleisen, who was the dominant player in the sport at the time, and the two became lifelong friends. Brumfield won his first National Paddleball Association (NPA) paddleball singles championships in 1969, ending Muehleisen's streak.

This led naturally to a career in racquetball—or 'paddle rackets' as the sport was known at the time—a sport that Muehleisen was promoting on the West Coast. Muehleisen edged Brumfield out in a close tie breaker during the finals of the first national racquetball championship in 1969, a time when racquetball was still strictly an amateur sport. The rivalry between Brumfield and Muehleisen helped to bring the sport of racquetball of age in the early 1970s, and Brumfield won the first professional racquetball championship in 1972, a victory Brumfield ranks amongst his most important.

Brumfield won back-to-back national racquetball singles championships in 1972 and 1973 (winning 20 consecutive tournaments), then again in 1975 and 1976. He continued playing world class racquetball for the next 10 years. However, the official ball became much faster in the latter part of Brumfield's career, and this did not suit his game style. In 2003, Brumfield's contemporary, Jerry Hilecher, said: "With a slower ball, I don't think anyone would have been able to compete at his level. With a fast ball, he would be one of many close to the top."

During the late 1970s, Brumfield's major rival was Marty Hogan. This rivalry fueled the great popularity of the sport at that time, and was even the subject of a 1978 LeRoy Neiman painting which was widely published in poster form. Brumfield and Hogan were the first players to have earned fame and large incomes from the sport, and their stature as professional athletes capable of earning endorsements outside the sport has not been equaled by anyone who has followed them in the sport.

Brumfield has also won numerous national racquetball open doubles titles—first with Muehleisen in 1969, then in 1973 with Steve Serot, and finally in 1975 with Craig McCoy—as well as  outdoor national racquetball doubles championships with Muehlheisen and Serot in 1974 and 1975. According to Muelheisen, the team of Brumfield and Muelheisen never lost a game—let alone a match—in national level competition play; a feat not since equaled by any regular racquetball partnership. In an interview with Apex magazine (a Handball/Racquetball/Squash publication, Summer 2008), Muehleisen said that no team ever scored more than 13 against Muehleisen and Brumfield in tournament play. Games were played to 21 in those days, making this achievement all the more impressive. Brumfield denies that he and Muehleisen were undefeated, and attributes Muehleisen's failure to remember the occasional loss to a particular fondness for those days. But Brumfield has never cited a specific defeat that he and Muehleisen suffered, and there are no official records to verify such a loss.

Brumfield also won the outdoor national racquetball singles championships in 1974 and 1975 in his only attempts at that title. He and Hogan are the only players to ever win the triple crown of singles championships in indoor racquetball, outdoor racquetball, and paddleball. Brumfield also won the triple crown of doubles championships, a feat unlikely to be repeated. Marty Hogan has described Brumfield as both the best doubles player, and the best outdoor player ever to play the game.

In 1988, Brumfield became the sixth person inducted into the Racquetball Hall of Fame. In 2013, Brumfield became only the second person inducted in the Outdoor Racquetball Hall of Fame. He was also awarded the USRA Lifetime Achievement Award in 2013 for his overall contributions to the sport.

After leaving the racquetball circuit, Brumfield returned to paddleball where he is a perennial force to be reckoned with. The slower ball in paddleball once again favored his game style and natural abilities. He has won numerous NPA age group titles in paddleball, both in singles and doubles. In March 2013 he won his most recent national singles title by defeating Andrew Mitchell in the Golden Master's (55 and older) age group, giving him a 3-0 record against Mitchell in national singles finals. In April 2013, at age 65, Brumfield (with partner Bull Sterken) won his most recent national doubles title, also in Men's Golden Master's. Brumfield has won several Golden Master's (55 and older) doubles titles with Eric Campbell (another former racquetball pro), and at age 55 he won the 2004 Senior's (35 and older) national paddleball doubles title with Mike Wisniewski, giving nearly 20 years to some of his younger opponents in that age group. In 2016, suffering from problems related to treatment for his prostate cancer, Brumfield placed second in the Golden Master's. In 2014, Brumfield became the third inductee to the Paddleball Hall of Fame, making him the only player ever to be inducted into all three Halls of Fame (indoor racquetball, outdoor racquetball, and paddleball).

Brumfield plays occasional exhibition matches with reigning open singles champions including Kelly Gelhaus, Chris Crowther, and Aaron Embry. Steve Keeley described Brumfield as the second best paddleball player of all time (behind Keeley himself). Brumfield is also a member of the NPA Board of Directors, and is the founder of Paddleball Nation, a group of paddleball players in Southern California. Members of Paddleball Nation have won more than half of the paddleball national championships since its inception in 2003. The dominance of Paddleball Nation in national competition was the subject of the lead story, entitled "Racquetball and Brum get credit for success of Paddleball Nation", in the NPA's Fall 2009 newsletter.

Game style 

Brumfield's game has been described as a "finesse" style, and he and Muehleisen are generally regarded as the best finesse players to have ever played racquetball or paddleball. The finesse game is neither a power game nor a control game. The control player, exemplified by Steve Keeley, is able to execute each shot precisely and score on the basis of that precise execution. The power player, exemplified by Marty Hogan, is able to put pace on the ball, using that pace to overwhelm the opponent, and scoring by driving the ball past the opponent or causing the opponent to make a weak return. Brumfield's "finesse" style has elements of both control and power, but is better characterized by impeccable shot selection: having appropriate measures of control and power, without requiring either of these in order to place the ball outside the opponent's reach. This quality of intelligence has allowed Brumfield to compete at an extremely high level all of his life, and to win on occasions where he was playing with fairly serious injuries. Hogan's instructional book Marty Hogan's Power Racquetball describes Brumfield as "the smartest player alive".

On the professional tour, Brumfield set records for "delivering the most donuts" (games in which the opponent scored 0 points). Those records still hold in spite of the fact that games on the pro tour went from 21 points in Brumfield's era to 15 points in Hogan's era, to 11 points in Cliff Swain's. Brumfield generally makes his opponents move clumsily in the court by setting decoys and deceptions and forcing them out of position. He has characterized racquetball and paddleball as being more like basketball than tennis in that while there is a superficial similarity to tennis (the sports are both played by hitting a small ball with a racket or paddle) the strategy for court coverage is profoundly different. In paddleball or racquetball—like basketball—the opponents are playing for position on the same piece of real estate, and need to use strength, size, cleverness, and agility to win position without undo contact with other players. Brumfield often speaks of "getting small" to move past an opponent and into proper court coverage, and "getting big" to prevent the opponent from moving into proper court coverage. This philosophy has had a profound impact on Brumfield's style, as he tends to sacrifice technical swing mechanics when such sacrifice allows him to move his opponent out of position, or when he can use his own body to block his opponent's view of the ball, particularly while the ball is traveling between Brumfield's paddle/racket and the front wall. This forces a dramatic reduction in the opponent's ability to anticipate the shot, giving the opponent less time to react and allowing Brumfield numerous options.

Brumfield's style is characterized by great patience, taking few chances and maintaining confidence that he will have other opportunities to close the point. A typical Brumfield rally moves the opponent a bit out of position on the first shot, possibly by an exaggerated swing follow through that causes the opponent to duck the paddle and forces a slightly weak or off balance return by the opponent, then moving the opponent farther out of position on the second shot with a deception and forcing a somewhat weaker return and slower recovery, which Brumfield follows by holding the opponent out of position and freezing the opponent by denying him a view of the ball, and then hitting a finishing shot or a pass (either of which can be hit with minimal precision under these circumstances) to end the rally. The opponent, in many cases, cannot even see the finishing ball strike the wall due to the position of Brumfield's body. This style builds momentum as the rally or match go on, and places the opponent under severe stress. The opponent becomes fatigued by trying to understand what Brumfield is going to do, and this prevents the opponent from playing his own game. Even players in better physical condition than Brumfield find themselves physically and emotionally drained after playing a match with him. Brumfield will also occasionally break an opponent by hitting the same ball to the opponent over and over until the opponent loses patience and ceases to cover, or is no longer mentally capable of striking the ball.

Brumfield is often criticized for psychological play, including delays during the game and intimidating opponents both on and off the court. Immediately prior to his first encounter with Hogan, Brumfield is reported to have hit his opponent with a racket. He is alleged to have walked off the court and showered between points when a referee's call went the other way. In June 1974, Sports Illustrated reported that "He has been known to intimidate opponents and referees with rackets, balls, words, gestures and interminable delaying routines when he needs rest." Steve Keeley writes: "He is the omnipresent 'villain' while pestering the foe, ramrodding the ref, and fomenting the crowd. ...I personally have leaped to his physical defense on two events." Suffice it to say that of the four major NPA trophies for paddleball, Brumfield has won all of them except for the Sportsmanship trophy. However, his contributions to both racquetball and paddleball are beyond question, and in 2004, mostly for his work with Paddleball Nation, he was awarded the prestigious Earl Riskey Memorial Trophy for outstanding contributions to the sport of paddleball. He was also the 2007 honoree at the Pig Roast & Human Sacrifice, a midwestern regional paddleball doubles tournament that honors a player's significant contributions to the game.

Brumfield is also noteworthy as a showman, and has at various times taken on racquetball opponents playing with a shoe or a bottle instead of a racket or paddle. At times he will play an entire game, match, or tournament hitting a single type of serve, and he will sometimes play a serious racquetball tournament with a paddle (instead of a racket), putting himself at significant disadvantage. He has a penchant for what he calls his "science experiments" that can involve a novel way of gripping the racket, or a variation on footwork, or an unusual modification of a paddle, etc. These "science experiments" often take weeks or months but when he has learned what he wants from them he may go on to the next experiment and never look back at that variation again.

Brumfield still draws large and boisterous crowds when he competes at national tournaments and remains popular amongst fans. In a 2009 interview, outdoor racquetball great Tony Gambone was asked "what was the greatest match you ever saw?" He answered: "Every Charlie Brumfield match I have seen."

Legal career
Brumfield graduated magna cum laude from the University of San Diego (USD) with degrees in economics and business administration and then went on to earn a degree in law from USD, all during the period when he was playing professional racquetball. He currently serves as in-house counsel to Pure Bioscience of El Cajon, California, a suburb of San Diego.

See also
 List of racquetball players

References

American racquetball players
Living people
1948 births
Sportspeople from Oceanside, California
University of San Diego School of Law alumni
University of San Diego alumni
California lawyers